Jaime Navarro Cintrón (born March 27, 1967) is a former Puerto Rican baseball player and current pitching coach for the Uni-President Lions for the Chinese Professional Baseball League in Taiwan. He is the son of former Major League Baseball pitcher Julio Navarro.

Baseball career

Early years
After graduating from Luis Pales Matos High School in Santa Rosa, Puerto Rico, Navarro was drafted by the Baltimore Orioles in the 2nd round of the January  amateur draft, but did not sign. On June 2, 1986, Navarro was drafted again by the Orioles in the 2nd round, but he still did not sign. Exactly a year later, in the  June amateur draft, Navarro was drafted by the Milwaukee Brewers as the 71st overall pick in the third round, and he signed with the team two days later. Navarro spent the rest of the  season and the following two seasons playing in the Brewers minor league system, working his way up from rookie-level ball with the Helena Brewers to Triple-A (AAA) ball with the Denver Zephyrs.

Milwaukee Brewers
Only weeks into the  minor league baseball season, Navarro was called up to the majors. He made his debut on June 20, starting in front a crowd of 17,185 fans at County Stadium in a pitching duel against the Kansas City Royals' Charlie Leibrandt. Navarro tossed six innings of quality baseball, giving up eight hits and one earned run, while walking two and striking out two. Leibrandt pitched equally well and the game was ultimately decided by each team's relief pitchers. Brewers pitcher Mark Knudson gave up six runs in the 11th inning, and cost Navarro his first major league win. Navarro eventually picked up his first major league win five days later in a 3–1 victory against pitcher Jerry Reuss and the Chicago White Sox at home. Navarro continued as Brewers starting pitcher for the rest of the season, pitching in a total of nineteen games during the season. He posted a 7–8 record, with a 3.12 earned run average, 56 strikeouts, and a complete game on September 26. The following season, Navarro was sent back to the Class-AAA ball with the Denver Zephyrs.

Navarro was called up to the majors after a starting the season in the minors, and he spent the rest of the  season as a starter/reliever for the Brewers. The Brewers took note of Navarro's skill, and the 24-year-old was one of the team's five starting pitchers for the following season. In his first full season as a starter, Navarro posted a 15–12 record and a 3.92 earned run average. He also had ten complete games, two shutouts, and 114 strikeouts. Navarro had an even better season the following year, finishing with a 17–11 record, a 3.33 ERA and 100 strikeouts.

However, the following two seasons proved disastrous for Navarro, as he gave up a league-high and Brewers team record 127 earned runs and 254 hits in 214.1 innings of work. In his first start of the season, on April 11, 1994, Navarro was the winning pitcher for the inaugural Texas Rangers baseball game at The Ballpark in Arlington. Through the season, Navarro showed no sign of improvement, finishing the season with a 4–9 record and 6.62 ERA. Left with few options, the Brewers granted Navarro free agency on April 7, .

Chicago Cubs
Two days after being granted free agency, Navarro signed with the Chicago Cubs. Navarro started in 29 games for the Cubs that year, and posted much-improved numbers on the season. He led the team in many pitching categories that year, such as wins and innings pitched. Navarro was granted free agency on November 1, but on December 8, he accepted the Cubs' salary arbitration offer, and then agreed to a $3.4 million contract for the  season. Navarro led the team again in 1996 with a 15–12 record, 3.92 earned run average, four complete games and 158 strikeouts. Oddly enough, Navarro also led the league in batters faced and hits allowed. On October 28, Navarro was again granted free agency by the Cubs and he signed to a four-year, $20 million contract with the crosstown rivals of the Cubs, the White Sox, on December 11.

Chicago White Sox
The three years (–) that Navarro spent with the White Sox were far from a success. One of Navarro's only highlights of the 1997 season was his surprising dominance against the Boston Red Sox; most memorable is a 10–1 victory against the team on May 20, which gave Navarro his 10th straight win against the Red Sox, dating back to September 28, . The  season was just as disappointing for Navarro, as he finished with a dismal 8–16 record and a league-high 6.36 ERA, and led the league in wild pitches and losses. Navarro showed no improvement the following year either, and the White Sox traded Navarro and fellow pitcher John Snyder to the Milwaukee Brewers for pitcher Cal Eldred and infielder José Valentín.

AAA baseball
Navarro became another addition to the starting rotation of the Brewers for the beginning of the 2000 season. In five starts with the team, he only pitched 18.7 innings, posted an 0–5 record, gave up eighteen walks, and had an ERA of 12.54. Less than a month into the season, the Brewers released him. Sixteen days later, he was signed as a free agent by the Colorado Rockies. The Rockies sent Navarro back down to Triple-A baseball with the Colorado Springs Sky Sox in the Pacific Coast League. He showed some improvement in Triple-A, but he was released by the Rockies a month after being signed by the team. The next day, the Cleveland Indians picked up Navarro as a free agent, and he agreed to be sent back down to AAA ball with the Buffalo Bisons in the International League, after Indians manager Charlie Manuel suggested he learn to be a reliever.

He was later called up to the big leagues in a role as a starter/reliever, and he did not fare well in his return to the big leagues. This was the last time he played in the major leagues, as Navarro was later designated for assignment to clear up space on the Indians' 40-man roster. He played with the Bisons for the remainder of the  season before being granted free agency by the Indians on October 2. He was signed by the Toronto Blue Jays on December 13, and subsequently released on March 11, .

Nearly a year later, on January 31, the St. Louis Cardinals agreed to terms on a minor league contract with Navarro and assigned him to the Triple-A Memphis Redbirds of the Pacific Coast League. More than a year later, Navarro signed with the Cincinnati Reds to play for the Triple-A Louisville Bats of the International League. Navarro looked much better after only giving up three earned runs in ten innings of work in two starts for Louisville. However, he was released by the Reds on June 6, . Later, he played with the unaffiliated Newark Bears of the Atlantic League as a starting pitcher. After his stint with the Bears, Navarro did not play professional baseball in the U.S again.

Italian baseball
Navarro spent three years pitching in Italy for Bbc Grosseto of the Italian Baseball League. His 18 wins and 1.76 ERA helped his team win the 2004 Italian League and play in the European Champions League, which Grosseto won in 2005 and Navarro was named MVP. In the early months of the 2005 season, Navarro had a serious bike accident that cost him the rest of the season, but he managed to come back for the 2006 season, finishing 9–7 with a 2.03 ERA.

Coaching career
Days after the 2006 season's finale, he had a rough discussion with Grosseto management and decided not to pitch again in Italy. In , he was the pitching coach for the Wisconsin Timber Rattlers of the Midwest League. On January 13, he was named the pitching coach for the Single-A High Desert Mavericks. After the '09 season Navarro was named as the pitching coach for the Triple-A Tacoma Rainiers of the Pacific Coast League.

Navarro was the Mariners bullpen coach from 2011-13. Navarro was released by the Seattle Mariners organization, along with 9 other coaches, after the 2015 season.

From 2016-2019 Navarro was the pitching coach for Pericos of Puebla and Acereros of Monclova for the Mexican Baseball League. In 2020, he was the pitching coach for the Uni-President 7/11 Lions of the CPBL.

Record
The Navarros (Jaime and his father Julio) were the first father and son to each record a major league save. They were followed by Pedro Borbón and Pedro Borbón, Jr.; Steve Grilli and Jason Grilli; and Jeff Russell and James Russell.

In 2014 Navarro was inducted in the Milwaukee Brewers Wall of Honor.

See also
 List of Major League Baseball players from Puerto Rico
 List of second-generation Major League Baseball players

References

External links
, or Baseball Library, or Retrosheet, or Mexican League

1967 births
Living people
Buffalo Bisons (minor league) players
Cangrejeros de Santurce (baseball) players
Chicago Cubs players
Chicago White Sox players
Cleveland Indians players
Colorado Springs Sky Sox players
Denver Zephyrs players
El Paso Diablos players
Grosseto Baseball Club players
Guerreros de Oaxaca players
Helena Brewers players
Liga de Béisbol Profesional Roberto Clemente pitchers
Lobos de Arecibo players
Louisville Bats players
Major League Baseball pitchers
Major League Baseball players from Puerto Rico
Mexican League baseball pitchers
Miami Dade Sharks baseball players
Milwaukee Brewers players
Minor league baseball coaches
Newark Bears players
Sportspeople from Bayamón, Puerto Rico
Puerto Rican expatriate baseball players in Mexico
Seattle Mariners coaches
Stockton Ports players
Puerto Rican expatriate baseball players in Italy
Uni-President 7-Eleven Lions coaches